Maracalagonis (mara meaning "marsh"),  is a comune (municipality) in the Metropolitan City of Cagliari in the Italian region Sardinia, located about  northeast of Cagliari.

Maracalagonis borders the following municipalities: Castiadas, Quartu Sant'Elena (more specifically Salmagi), Quartucciu, Sinnai, Villasimius.

References 

Cities and towns in Sardinia